Rhododendron minus var. minus, the Carolina azalea or Carolina rhododendron, is a rhododendron species native to the mountains of North Carolina, South Carolina, Tennessee, and Northeast Georgia. It is commonly known as Rhododendron carolinianum in the horticultural trade.

Cultivation 
Cultivars include 'Album', 'Carolina Gold', 'Luteum' and 'White Perfection'. R. caroliniaum was crossed with Rhododendron dauricum to create the PJM hybrids.

References

Bibliography 
 The Plant List: Rhododendron carolinianum
 
 North Carolina State University: Rhododendron carolinianum
 Alfred Rehder. RHODODENDRON CAROLINIANUM, A NEW RHODODENDRON FROM NORTH CAROLINA. Rhodora, Vol. 14, No. 162 (June, 1912), pp. 97–102

External links 
 

carolinianum
Flora of the Southeastern United States